Thomas Cave (16 October 1825 – 2 November 1894) was a British Liberal politician.

Political career
Cave was returned to Parliament for Barnstaple in 1865, a seat he held until 1880. He also served as Sheriff of London between 1863 and 1864 and was a Justice of the Peace for Surrey.

Family
Cave married Elizabeth, daughter of Jasper Shallcrass, in 1849. They had five sons, including Lord Chancellor George Cave, 1st Viscount Cave and Basil Cave, Consul-General in Zanzibar and Algiers, and five daughters, one of whom, Harriett, married the businessman and philanthropist Max Waechter. Cave died in Brighton on 2 November 1894, aged 69. Elizabeth survived him by over 30 years and died in November 1925.

References

Sources

External links 
 

1825 births
1894 deaths
English justices of the peace
Liberal Party (UK) MPs for English constituencies
Members of the Parliament of the United Kingdom for Barnstaple
Sheriffs of the City of London
UK MPs 1865–1868
UK MPs 1868–1874
UK MPs 1874–1880